The Pan-African Freedom Movement of East and Central Africa (PAFMECA), later renamed the Pan-African Freedom Movement of East, Central and Southern Africa (PAFMECSA) was a political and Pan-Africanist organisation that was formed to campaign for the independence of the countries of East and Central Africa (and later Southern Africa) from colonial and white minority rule. The organisation was formed at a conference held in Mwanza, Tanganyika, from 16 to 18 September 1958. Julius Nyerere (later President of Tanzania) and Tom Mboya the Kenyan Pan-Africanist and trade unionist were among the founders. Nyerere came up with the idea for the conference.

History
PAFMECA was formed in the town of Mwanza on the shores of Lake Victoria in northern Tanganyika under the leadership of Julius Nyerere. Nyerere was the leader of the Tanganyika African National Union (TANU), the party that campaigned for the independence of Tanganyika.

He called a meeting of the representatives of the nationalist parties in the region which was held in Mwanza from 16 – 18 September 1958. It was attended by representatives of political parties from Kenya, Uganda, Zanzibar, Nyasaland and Tanganyika to mobilise forces and coordinate their efforts in pursuit of independence and PAFMECA was born.

One of the main subjects discussed was the existence of the colonial Federation of Rhodesia and Nyasaland, also known as the Central African Federation (composed of Nyasaland, Northern Rhodesia and Southern Rhodesia), in the context of the African liberation struggle.

The leaders feared that the continued existence of the white-dominated federation would perpetuate imperial domination of the region and lead to the creation of another South Africa which during that time and until the early nineties was under absolute white control.

PAFMECA was Pan-Africanist in outlook and played a major role in the formation of the Organisation of African Unity (OAU) in Addis Ababa, Ethiopia, in May 1963.

References

Organizations established in 1958
Former international organizations
Politics of Tanzania
Political organisations based in Tanzania
1958 establishments in Tanganyika
Pan-African organizations